Norah McClintock (March 11, 1952 – February 6, 2017) was a Canadian writer of young adult fiction.

Biography 
Born and raised in Montreal, Quebec, McClintock received a degree in history from McGill University. She later lived in Toronto. She was a member of the Canadian Society of Children's Authors, Illustrators, and Performers and Crime Writers of Canada.

McClintock married Herman Rosenfeld and had two daughters.

Selected works

The Mike & Riel series
2003 — Hit and Run
2004 — Dead and Gone
2004 — Truth and Lies
2006 —  Believe

The Robyn Hunter series
2006 — Last Chance
2006 — You can Run
2007 — Nothing to Lose
2007 — Out of the Cold
2008 — Shadow of Doubt
2009 — Nowhere to Turn
2009 — Change of Heart
2010 — In Too Deep
2010 — At The Edge

The Chloe & Levesque series
2000 — Over the Edge
2001 —  — winner Juvenile Crime Book"
2002 — Break and Enter — winner of the 2003 Arthur Ellis Award for "Best Juvenile Crime Book"
2003 — No Escape
2005 — Double Cross
2005 — Not a Trace
2005 — The Third Degree

Ryan Dooley Series
2007 — Dooley Takes The Fall - White Pine nominee, 2009, Spinetingler Magazine Award Nominee, 2009 Canadian Children's Book Centre Our Choice, 2009
2009 — Homicide Related: A Ryan Dooley Mystery

Other works
1989 — Sixty-Four Sixty-Five
1989 — Shakespeare and Legs
1991 — The Stepfather Game
1993 — Jack's Back
1995 — Mistaken Identity — winner of the 1996 Arthur Ellis Award for "Best Juvenile Crime Book"
1997 — The Body in the Basement — winner of the 1998 Arthur Ellis Award for "Best Juvenile Crime Book"
1998 — Sins of the father — winner of the 1999 Arthur Ellis Award for "Best Juvenile Crime Book"
1999 — Password: Murder
2004 — A Lot to Lose
2011 - She Said/She Saw
2015 - ‘’My Life Before Me’’

References

External links

Norah McClintock at publisher Scholastic Canada

1958 births
2017 deaths
Canadian crime fiction writers
Canadian writers of young adult literature
McGill University alumni
Writers from Montreal
Deaths from cancer in Ontario
Deaths from ovarian cancer